Falkneria camerani is a species of air-breathing land snail, a terrestrial pulmonate gastropod mollusk in the family Helicodontidae.

This species is endemic to northwestern Italy. It is only known from five locations in Aosta Valley, Cervo Valley, Valsesia and Sessera Valley. Its natural habitat is rocky areas. It is threatened by habitat loss and, possibly, acid precipitation.

This taxon was incorrectly listed by Giusti & Manganelli in 1990, as "Falkneri camerani", due to an orthographic error.

References 

Hygromiidae
Molluscs of Europe
Endemic fauna of Italy
Gastropods described in 1880
Taxonomy articles created by Polbot